Adell may refer to: 

Adell, Wisconsin, US, a village
Adell Township, Sheridan County, Kansas, US, a township
Adell (surname)
Adell Vera Hall (1902–1964), American folk singer
Adell, a main character in the video game Disgaea 2: Cursed Memories

See also
Adel (disambiguation)
Adele (disambiguation)
Adela (disambiguation)